Linda Oe (born 18 February 1987) is a Luxembourg footballer. A goalkeeper, she played five times for the Luxembourg women's national football team.

Club career

Oe played for Minerva Lintgen and US Berdorf/Consdorf before returning to Lintgen. In 2013 she signed for Pratz/Redange.

International career 

Oe first played for Luxembourg in a victory against Latvia in 2008 and went on to earn five caps.

References

1987 births
Living people
Luxembourgian women's footballers
Luxembourg women's international footballers
Women's association football goalkeepers